Count Carl Gustaf Mannerheim (10 August 1797 – 9 October 1854) was a Finnish entomologist and governor of the Viipuri province in the Grand Duchy of Finland.

Career
From 1819 he served as the secretary to the Finnish Minister Secretary of State in Saint Petersburg. In 1833 he was appointed governor of the Vaasa Province and soon after of Viipuri and Savonlinna County. From 1839 until his death he served as the chief judge of the newly formed Imperial Court of Appeals (“Kayserlichen Hofgerichtes”, hovioikeus) in Vyborg.

Scientific contributions
Mannerheim devoted much of his time to natural sciences and acquired a significant scientific collection of Coleoptera. He published many papers concerning them and worked on the collections of the natural history museums of Dorpat, Saint-Petersburg and Moscow. He contributed greatly to the knowledge of the coleopteran fauna of western North America (then Russian America).

Societies and organizations
Mannerheim was a member of the St Petersburg Academy of Sciences (1827) and of the Finnish Society of Sciences and Letters (1838) and a foreign member of the Royal Swedish Academy of Sciences (1852). He was decorated with the Cross of the Order of Saint Stanislaus and was made a knight of the Order of Saint Vladimir.

Personal life
He was the son of Vendla Sofia von Willebrand and Count Carl Erik Mannerheim (1759–1837), the first vice-chairman of the finance ministry of the senate, now equivalent to being the Prime Minister of Finland.

Mannerheim was married to Eva Wilhelmina von Schantz; they had a son Carl Robert Mannerheim, who was an aristocrat and businessman. Carl Robert's son Baron Carl Gustaf Emil Mannerheim (1867–1951) became Marshal and President of Finland.

Gallery

Publications
 Mannerheim, C. G. von. 1825. Novae coleopterorum species imperii Rossici incolae descriptae, in Hummel, Essais entomologiques, 1(4):19-41.
 Mannerheim, C. G. von. 1837. Enumération des Buprestides, et description de quelques nouvelles espèces de cette tribu de la famille des Sternoxes, de la collection de M. Le Comte Mannerheim. Bulletin de la Société Impériale des Naturalistes de Moscou 8:1-126.
 Mannerheim, C. G. von. 1837. Mémoire sur quelques genres et espèces de Carabiques
 Mannerheim, C. G. von. 1844.Description de quelques nouvelles espèces de Coléoptères de Finlande
 Mannerheim, C. G. von. 1843.Mémoire sur la récolte d'insectes coléoptères faite en 1842
Mannerheim, C. G. von. 1843. Beitrag zur Käferfauna der Aleutischen Inseln, der Insel Sitkha und Neu-Californiens. Bulletin de la Société Impériale des Naturalistes de Moscou 16:3–142.
 Mannerheim, C. G. von. 1844. Lettre a S. E. Mr. Fischer de Waldheim ou relation d un voyage fait en 1844, en Suede, en Danemarck et dans nord de l'Allemagne. Bull. Soc. Imp. Nat. Moscou, 17: 844–872.
Mannerheim, C. G. von. 1852. Insectes Coléoptères de la Sibérie orientale nouveaux ou peu connus. Bulletin de la Société Impériale des Naturalistes de Moscou, 25:273–309.
Mannerheim, C. G. von. 1853. Dritter Nachtrag zur Kefer-Fauna der Nord-Amerykanischen Laender der Russischen Reiches.'' Bulletin de la Société Impériale des Naturalistes de Moscou, 3:3–181.

References

External links
 The Mannerheim family
 Scarab Workers

1797 births
1854 deaths
People from Masku
19th-century Finnish nobility
19th-century Swedish nobility
Finnish entomologists
Carl Gustaf Mannerheim
Corresponding members of the Saint Petersburg Academy of Sciences
Members of the Royal Swedish Academy of Sciences
Swedish-speaking Finns
Finnish people of German descent
Coleopterists